There were two independent candidates in the 2003 Manitoba provincial election, neither of who were elected.  They received a total of 167 votes.  Information about these candidates may be found on this page.

Didz Zuzens (Fort Garry)

Zuzens has campaigned for the House of Commons of Canada and the Legislative Assembly of Manitoba on a total of four occasions.

He intended to register as a Libertarian Party of Canada candidate for his first federal campaign in 1997, but was informed by an Elections Canada official that he could not do so as the party had withdrawn from the election.   Zuzens acknowledged that he had been told of the party's decertification before registering, but added "Maybe I didn't want to hear that I wasn't going to be the candidate.  It may be delirious, but I just refused to believe that".  He registered as an independent candidate in 1997, and again in 2000.

At the provincial level, Zuzens campaigned for the Libertarian Party of Manitoba in 1999 and as an independent in 2003.  The LPM was registered for the 2003 election, and it is unclear why Zuzens ran as an independent.

Zuzens lists himself as retired.  He wrote against Canada's public health system in 2000, describing it as the "Canada Waiting List" system.

Colin Atkins (Minnedosa)

Atkins is a leading organizer for the federal Christian Heritage Party in Manitoba.  He received 106 votes (1.54%), finishing fourth against Progressive Conservative candidate Leanne Rowat.

Footnotes

2003